Reginald Charles Francis Schomberg (1880–1958) was a British officer and explorer, who served in Asia.

Family and education
Schomberg was the son of Reginald Brodrick Schomberg (1848–1932) and Frances Sophia Schomberg (1839–1922), and a descendant of the physician Meyer Low Schomberg (1690–1761). He was educated at the Oratory School, Edgbaston, Birmingham (1892–8), then New College, Oxford, where he graduated in 1901.

Military and diplomatic career
Schomberg served mainly in Asia. His military career took him to India (1902–11), he served in the Malay states guides (early 1910s), he went to Mesopotamia (1915) and Palestine (1917), Malaya (1919), India (1922), and Ladakh (1923). He retired in 1927. He also held several diplomatic posts. He was British consul-general in French establishments in India (1936–37, 1938–41); and consul-general for Portuguese possessions in India (from 1939). He was consular liaison officer, Persia (1942–3), and customs officer, Perso-Indian frontier (1943–4). From 1944 to 1945 he was colonel in force 136 (part of the Special Operations Executive), China.

Travels
He made several journeys in Central Asia, in 1926, 1927–29 and 1930–31, Baltistan (1937), and Ladakh (1944, 1945, 1946).

Awards and honours
 Royal Geographical Society's Gill memorial medal
 1937 C.I.E.

Publications
 1933 Peaks and Plains of Central Asia 
 1935 Between the Oxus and the Indus 
 1936 Unknown Karakorum  
 1938 Kafirs and Glaciers

He also wrote articles and reviews for the Alpine Journal, the Geographical Journal, the Himalayan Journal, the Journal of the Royal Central Asian Society, and the Scottish Geographical Journal.

Religious life
From 1947 to 1951, Schomberg studied for the priesthood in Rome, and subsequently worked in England: at Ringwood, Hampshire (1952–53), the Assisi Home, grayshot (1953–54), and the Sisters of St Joseph, Boars Hill, Oxford (1954–57).

He was buried at Belmont Abbey, Hereford.

See also
 Rosie Llewellyn-Jones (2018) "Letters from the RSAA Archive: Sir Aurel Stein, Colonel Reginald Schomberg and a secret mission to Central Asia", Asian Affairs, 49:3, 492–506.

External links
 Schomberg's publications on Worldcat
 Schomberg's entries on National Archives

Footnotes

Sources
 Oxford Dictionary of National Biography

Seaforth Highlanders officers
British explorers
People from Walmer
Companions of the Distinguished Service Order
English Roman Catholic priests
Alumni of New College, Oxford
British Army personnel of World War I
1880 births
1958 deaths
Companions of the Order of the Indian Empire